Issi ben Judah ("Issi ben Yehuda") was a Tanna of the late 2nd century and early 3rd century. He is often identified with R. Yosi Ish Hakfar HaBavli (Pirkei Avot 4:26), Yosef HaBavli, Issi Ha-babli, and Yosi/Yosef Ish Hutzal.

Biography
He made Aliyah from Hutzal, Babylon, to the Land of Israel, and thus his name (Issi/Yosi/Yosef) is often followed by the title "Ha-Bavli" (the Babylonian) or "Ish Hutzal" (man of Hutzal). He was a disciple of Eleazar ben Shammua.

Issi ben Judah is often confounded with Issi ben Judah bar 'Hai.

The Talmud cites a baraita Issi had several other names:

With regard to Rabbi Yosei of Hutzal, it was taught: The Yosef of Hutzal mentioned in other places in the Gemara is the same person as Yosef the Babylonian. Yosef is the full name of Yosei. Furthermore, he is also known as Isi ben Gur Arye, he is Isi ben Yehuda, he is Isi ben Gamliel, and he is Isi ben Mahalalel. And what is his real name? His real name is Isi ben Akavya.Yoma 52a, bottom baraita: And wasn’t it taught in a baraita that Yosef of Hutzal is the one called Yosef the Babylonian, as Hutzal is a city in Babylonia; and he is also the person called Isi ben Yehuda, as Isi is a shortened form of Yosef; he is Isi ben Gur Arye, a nickname for Yehuda; he is Isi ben Gamliel; he is Isi ben Mahalalel? And what is his real name? Isi ben Akiva is his name. If they are indeed the same person, Isi ben Yehuda, who is Yosef of Hutzal, says that there are only five verses whose punctuation is unclear, whereas above he adds an additional verse.https://www.sefaria.org/Yoma.52b.6?ven=William_Davidson_Edition_-_English&vhe=William_Davidson_Edition_-_Vocalized_Aramaic&lang=bi&with=all&lang2=en

He was distinguished by the high esteem in which he held his colleagues, whose learning and ability he characterized in the most flattering terms.

Teachings

Halacha
He ruled that the commandment to stand in the presence of the aged (Leviticus 19:32), which other rabbis believed applies only to an elderly Talmid Chacham, in fact applies to any aged person.

He valued the respect of parents so highly that (according to him) one must abandon fulfilling any mitzvah that can be fulfilled by another person, if that is necessary to carry out a father's order.

His opinions regarding culpability for sabbath transgressions and regarding anyone's right to eat from another's vineyard were recorded in the so-called Meggilat Setarim (Scroll of Hidden Things). However, in both cases his opinion is rejected by the Rabbis.

Aggadah
He declared that there are five passages in the Pentateuch, each of which contains a word that cannot be positively connected with either the preceding or the following words. This remark was afterward incorporated in the Masorah, where it is noted that "there are five passages in the Pentateuch that have an undecided word."

References

Mishnah rabbis
2nd-century rabbis
3rd-century rabbis